Newroz Dogan (born 9 September 1979 in Denmark) is a Danish retired footballer.

References

Danish men's footballers
Living people
Association football forwards
Association football midfielders
1979 births
F.C. Copenhagen players